Anolis humilis, the humble anole, is a species of lizard in the family Dactyloidae. The species is found in Costa Rica, Panama, and Nicaragua.

References

Anoles
Reptiles of Costa Rica
Reptiles of Panama
Reptiles of Nicaragua
Reptiles described in 1863
Taxa named by Wilhelm Peters